Lonoke County is located in the Central Arkansas region of the U.S. state of Arkansas. As of the 2020 census, the population was 74,015, making it the 10th-most populous of Arkansas's 75 counties. The county seat is Lonoke and largest city is Cabot. Lonoke County was formed on April 16, 1873, from Pulaski County and Prairie County, and was named as a corruption of "lone oak", after a large red oak in the area that had been used by a surveyor to lay out the Memphis and Little Rock Railroad.

Located within Central Arkansas, the county's varied geography can be roughly broken into thirds horizontally. The top third has rolling hills at the edge of the Ozarks, including the Cabot area. The middle third, including the Lonoke area, contains portions of the Grand Prairie, a flat native grassland today known for rice farming, an important part of the culture, economy and history of Lonoke County. The southern third, including the Scott area, is home to the alluvial soils of the Arkansas Delta. Historically, a military road and a railroad brought settlers to the area, and cotton cultivation was very profitable. In 1904, a demonstration that rice could grow well on the same land coupled with sinking cotton prices drove the area into rice cultivation. During World War I, a United States Army World War I Flight Training airfield, Eberts Field, was constructed.

Lonoke County is included in the Central Arkansas metro area, with Little Rock as the principal city. In addition to agriculture, the county's economy sees tourists at the Camp Nelson Confederate Cemetery, Joe Hogan Fish Hatchery and Toltec Mounds State Park, Lonoke County is an alcohol prohibition or dry county.

Geography

State nature
Toltec Mounds
Plantation Agri. Mus. State Park
Bayou Meto

Major highways

 Interstate 40
 Future Interstate 57
 U.S. Highway 67
 U.S. Highway 70
 U.S. Highway 165
 U.S. Highway 167
 Highway 5
 Highway 13
 Highway 15
 Highway 31
 Highway 38
 Highway 89

Adjacent counties
White County (north)
Prairie County (east)
Arkansas County (southeast)
Jefferson County (south)
Pulaski County (west)
Faulkner County (northwest)

Demographics

2020 census

As of the 2020 United States census, there were 74,015 people, 26,052 households, and 18,824 families residing in the county.

2000 census
As of the 2000 census, there were 52,828 people, 19,262 households, and 15,024 families residing in the county. There were 20,749 housing units at an average density of 27 per square mile (10/km2). The racial makeup of the county was 91.03% White, 6.44% Black or African American, 0.49% Native American, 0.42% Asian, 0.03% Pacific Islander, 0.51% from other races, and 1.08% from two or more races.  1.75% of the population were Hispanic or Latino of any race.

There were 19,262 households, out of which 40.30% had children under the age of 18 living with them, 63.30% were married couples living together, 10.60% had a female householder with no husband present, and 22.00% were non-families. 19.00% of all households were made up of individuals, and 7.60% had someone living alone who was 65 years of age or older.  The average household size was 2.71 and the average family size was 3.09.

In the county, the population was spread out, with 28.70% under the age of 18, 8.00% from 18 to 24, 30.90% from 25 to 44, 21.90% from 45 to 64, and 10.40% who were 65 years of age or older.  The median age was 35 years. For every 100 females, there were 96.80 males.  For every 100 females age 18 and over, there were 93.50 males.

The median income for a household in the county was $40,314, and the median income for a family was $46,173. Males had a median income of $32,451 versus $22,897 for females. The per capita income for the county was $17,397.  About 8.10% of families and 10.50% of the population were below the poverty line, including 12.20% of those under age 18 and 13.60% of those age 65 or over.

Government
Over the past few election cycles, Lonoke County has trended heavily towards the Republican party. The last Democrat (as of 2020) to carry the county was Bill Clinton in 1996.

Communities

Cities
Austin
Cabot
Carlisle
England
Humnoke
Lonoke (county seat)
Ward

Towns
Allport
Coy
Keo

Census-designated place
Scott

Townships

 Butler
 Carlisle (Carlisle)
 Caroline (Austin, small part of Cabot, part of Ward)
 Cleveland
 Crooked Creek (Allport, Humnoke)
 Dortch (CDP Scott)
 Eagle
 Fletcher
 Furlow
 Goodrum
 Gray
 Gum Woods (England)
 Hamilton
 Indian Bayou (Coy)
 Isbell
 Lafayette (Keo)
 Lonoke (Lonoke)
 Magness (part of Cabot)
 Oak Grove (small part of Cabot)
 Pettus
 Prairie
 Pulaski
 Richwoods
 Scott
 Totten
 Walls
 Ward (part of Ward)
 Williams
 York (most of Cabot)

See also

List of dry counties in Arkansas
List of counties in Arkansas
 List of lakes in Lonoke County, Arkansas
National Register of Historic Places listings in Lonoke County, Arkansas

References

External links

 Lonoke County Sheriff's Office

 
1873 establishments in Arkansas
Little Rock–North Little Rock–Conway metropolitan area
Populated places established in 1873